Haldea striatula (formerly Virginia striatula), commonly called the rough earth snake,  is a species of nonvenomous natricine colubrid snake native to the Southeastern United States.

Taxonomy
The species was first described by Carl Linnaeus in 1766, as Coluber striatulus. Over the next two and a half centuries its scientific name has been changed several times (see synonyms). Most recently, the generic name was changed back from Virginia to Haldea in 2013.

Common names
Other common names for Haldea striatula include: brown ground snake, brown snake, ground snake, little brown snake, little striped snake, small brown viper, small-eyed brown snake, southern ground snake, striated viper, and worm snake.

Geographic range
The rough earth snake is found from southern Virginia to northern Florida, west along the Gulf Coast to southern Texas, and north into south-central Missouri and southeastern Kansas. It is also present in northern parts of Oklahoma.

Description
H. striatula is a small, harmless, secretive, fairly slender snake, 7–10 inches (18–25 cm) in total length (including tail). It has a round pupil, weakly keeled dorsal scales, and usually a divided anal plate. Dorsally, it is brown, gray, or reddish, and essentially has no pattern. Females are a little longer and heavier than males, with relatively shorter tails. Young individuals often have a light band on the neck, which is normally lost as they mature. The belly is tan to whitish and is not sharply defined in color from the back, unlike in the wormsnake (Carphophis amoenus) or the red-bellied snake (Storeria occipitomaculata). Keeled scales differentiate the rough earth snake from the similar smooth earth snake (Virginia valeriae), as well as from the wormsnake. H. striatula is most likely to be confused with De Kay's brown snake (Storeria dekayi), which is a little larger and is light brown with dark markings on the back and neck. Unlike the rough earth snake, De Kay's brown snake retains these markings into adulthood. Also, S. dekayi has a rounder snout than H. striatula.

Habitat
The rough earth snake is fossorial, hiding beneath logs, rocks, or ornamental stones, in leaf litter, or in compost piles and gardens. The species is found in a variety of forested habitats with plenty of ground cover, as well as in many urban areas. It can reach very high densities in urban gardens, parks, and vacant lots.

Reproduction
H. striatula is gonochoric. It is also viviparous, giving birth to 3 to 8 live young in mid-summer. Newborns are about 10 cm (4 inches) in total length. The young somewhat resemble the ring-necked snake (Diadophis punctatus) with a light-colored neck collar, but they are much drabber and lack a brightly-colored belly.

Many sources refer to snakes that give birth to live young as either ovoviviparous or viviparous. In reality, the distinction between these two terms is not very sharp, and the diversity of reproductive modes is better thought of as a spectrum or continuum between matrotrophy (embryonic nutrients come directly from the mother) and lecithotrophy (embryonic nutrients come mostly or completely from egg yolk). Viviparity is the most extreme form of matrotrophy, whereas oviparity is the most extreme form of lecithotrophy.

Behavior
The rough earth snake is not aggressive towards humans, is not venomous, and is harmless if encountered. Although it has teeth, the rough earth snake does not bite. Its response when harassed is to remain motionless, or to try to escape. It will defecate and excrete a foul smelling musk as a defense mechanism to make itself less palatable to would-be predators. If necessary, the rough earth snake can be safely picked up by hand and relocated.

Diet
H. striatula eats invertebrates. It feeds almost exclusively on earthworms, although slugs, snails, sow bugs, insect eggs and larvae have also been found in the stomach. H. striatula is not venomous and does not constrict prey; rather, it swallows prey without subduing it. The pointed snout of the rough earth snake helps in burrowing in moist soil where prey are found.

References

External links

Checklist of Florida Amphibians and Reptiles: Rough Earth Snake
South Carolina Reptiles and Amphibians: Earth Snake
Snakes of Georgia and South Carolina: Rough Earth Snake
Virginia Department of Game & Inland Fisheries: Rough Earth Snake

Further reading
Behler JL, King FW (1979). The Audubon Society Field Guide to North American Reptiles and Amphibians. New York: Alfred A. Knopf. 743 pp. . (Virginia striatula, pp. 678–679 + Plates 470, 473).
Boulenger GA (1893). Catalogue of the Snakes in the British Museum (Natural History). Volume I., Containing the Families ... Colubridæ Aglyphæ, part. London: Trustees of the British Museum (Natural History). (Taylor and Francis, printers). xiii + 448 pp. + Plates I-XXVIII. (Haldea striatula, p. 291).
Conant R (1975). A Field Guide to Reptiles and Amphibians of Eastern and Central North America. Boston: Houghton Mifflin Company. xviii + 429 pp. + Plates 1-48.  (hardcover),  (paperback). (Virginia striatula, p. 168 + Plate 22 + Map 124).
Conant R, Bridges W (1939). What Snake is That?: A Field Guide to the Snakes of the United States East of the Rocky Mountains. (with 108 drawings by Edmond Malnate). New York and London: D. Appleton-Century Company. Frontispiece map + viii + 163 pp. + Plates A-C, 1-32. (Haldea striatula, pp. 113–114).
Linnaeus C (1766). Systema naturæ per regna tria naturæ, secundum classes, ordines, genera, species, cum characteribus, differentiis, synonymis, locis. Tomus I. Editio Duodecima, Reformata. Stockholm: L. Salvius. 532 pp. (Coluber striatulus, new species, p. 275). (in Latin).
Schmidt KP, Davis DD (1941). Field Book of Snakes of the United States and Canada. New York: G.P. Putnam's Sons. 365 pp. (Haldea striatula, pp. 231–232, Figure 75 + Plate 25).
Smith HM, Brodie ED Jr (1982). Reptiles of North America: A Guide to Field Identification. New York: Golden Press. 240 pp.  (hardcover),  (paperback). (Virginia striatula, pp. 152–153).
Stejneger L, Barbour T (1917). A Check List of North American Amphibians and Reptiles. Cambridge, Massachusetts: Harvard University Press. 125 pp. (Potamophis striatulus, p. 99).
Wright AH, Wright AA (1957). Handbook of Snakes of the United States and Canada. Ithaca and London: Comstock Publishing Associates, A Division of Cornell University Press. 1,105 pp. (in two volumes). (Haldea striatula, pp. 287–290, Figure 88, Map 27).

Natricinae
Monotypic snake genera
Taxa named by Spencer Fullerton Baird
Taxa named by Charles Frédéric Girard